Gilbert Banda (born 30 May 1983 in Bulawayo) is a Zimbabwean former football player, who plays for How Mine and made 8 appearances for the Zimbabwe national team.

On 20 October 2012 Banda was banned from the sport for ten years for match fixing.

References

External links

1983 births
Living people
Zimbabwean footballers
Association football defenders
Sportspeople from Bulawayo
How Mine F.C. players
Highlanders F.C. players
Zimbabwe international footballers